The Diwan-i-Khas (Persian: ديوان خاص), or Hall of Private Audiences, was a chamber in the Red Fort of Delhi built-in 1648 as a location for receptions.  It was the location where the Mughal Emperor Shah Jahan received courtiers and state guests. It was also known as the Shah Mahal.

A gate on the north side of the preceding Diwan-i-Am audience hall led to the innermost court of the palace called Jalau Khana and the Diwan-i-Khas. Originally there were two enclosures on the west of the hall, one for the nobles and the other for those of a lower rank. These arcaded courts were destroyed after the Indian Rebellion of 1857.

It measures 90 x 67 feet. It consists of a rectangular central chamber, surrounded by a series of arches rising from marble piers. The lower parts of the piers are inlaid with floral designs, while the upper portions are painted and gilded. The four corners of the roof are surmounted by pillared chhatri.

The ceiling, which was originally inlaid with silver and gold, was stripped bare by successive financial crises of the empire by the Jats or Marathas. The current ceiling was installed in 1911. The later Peacock Throne from after Nader Shah's invasion once stood in this hall, towards the east side.

Through the centre of the hall flowed the Stream of Paradise (Nahar-i-Bihisht).. The building used to have red awnings, or shamianas. Over the corner-arches of the northern and southern walls below the cornice is inscribed the verse of Amir Khusrow: "If there be a paradise on earth, it is this, it is this, it is this." The French traveller François Bernier described seeing the Peacock Throne here. Jean-Baptiste Tavernier described seeing the throne in the Diwan-i-Am, to where it was probably moved, and described five smaller thrones with four on each corner and one in the middle of the hall.

The interior was completely plundered following the Indian Rebellion of 1857. The throne, the carpets, and any other items went missing. The hall today is, therefore, only a shell of what it used to be. Recent restoration work has been redone on the panels of inlay and has also reproduced the gilded pattern on one of the pillars fronting the hall.

In the riverbed below the hall and the connected buildings was the space known as zer-jharokha, or "beneath the lattices".

Gallery

See also
Diwan-i-Am
Diwan-i-Khas, Lahore

References

External links

Red Fort